The New York Rock and Soul Revue was a musical project which evolved from a series of concerts and musical shows produced by Libby Titus (future wife of Donald Fagen) that lasted from 1989 to 1992. The project was led by Donald Fagen (soloist and co-founder of Steely Dan) and included Phoebe Snow, Michael McDonald, Boz Scaggs, Eddie Brigati (formerly of The Rascals), David Brigati (also of The Rascals), Charles Brown, and Walter Becker (soloist and co-founder of Steely Dan). The project also featured Jeff Young and the Youngsters, saxophonist Cornelius Bumpus (who had formerly worked with Steely Dan, the Doobie Brothers and Boz Scaggs), and violinist Mindy Jostyn. The project is perhaps best known for its 1991 live release entitled The New York Rock and Soul Revue: Live at the Beacon, a compilation of material recorded live at New York City's Beacon Theatre.

Members
Line up:
Donald Fagen, vocal and piano
Jeff Young, piano
Michael McDonald, piano and vocals

Other musicians:
Drew Zingg, guitar
John Hagen, Cornelius Bumpus tenor sax
Dennis McDermott, drums
Lincoln Schleifer, bass
Chris Anderson, trumpet

Background vocals:
Catherine Russell
Dian Sorel
Ula Hedwig

References

External links
The New York Rock and Soul Revue performing Pretzel Logic (song) as Donald Fagen's New York Rock and Soul Revue, March, 1991. A&E Television

American soul musical groups
American supergroups